The 2015 World Draughts Championship at the international draughts was held November 8–24, 2015 at Emmen, Netherlands International Draughts Federation FMJD. Twenty players were competing in the tournament. It was played as a round-robin, with 19 rounds in total, each of which be micro-match from two games. The winning prize for the tournament was 25,000 euros.

Alexander Georgiev became World Draughts Champion in nine times.

Participants
The participants are nominated according to a schema and rules accepted by the FMJD General Assembly:

Rules and regulations
The games were played in the official FMJD time rate of the Fischer system with 1 hour and 20 minutes for the game plus 1 minute per move. Conforming to the FMJD regulations players are not allowed to agree on a draw before they both made 40 moves. If they do so nevertheless, the referee is obliged to decide on a 0-point each players.

The final classification was based on the total points obtained. If two or more players will have same total points to define the places:

1. the largest number of victories

2. the best results between this players

3. the best results obtained in order of the classification.

Results

Results by round

Round 1
 Ron Heusdens – Wouter Sipma 0–2
 Alexander Baliakin – Jean Marc Ndjofang 1–1
 Artem Ivanov – Raimonds Vipulis 1–1
 Roel Boomstra – Ainur Shaibakov 1–1
 Jan Groenendijk – Ganjargal Ganbaatar 1–1
 Freddy Loko – Arnaud Cordier 1–1
 NDiaga Samb – Frantz Forbin 2–0
 Leopold Kouogueu – Ncho Joel Atse 1–1
 Dul Erdenebileg – Alexey Chizhov 1–1
 Alexander Georgiev – Allan Silva 1–1

Round 2
 Wouter Sipma – Allan Silva 1–1
 Alexey Chizhov – Alexander Georgiev 1–1
 Ncho Joel Atse – Dul Erdenebileg 1–1
 Frantz Forbin – Leopold Kouogueu 1–1
 Arnaud Cordier – NDiaga Samb 1–1
 Ganjargal Ganbaatar – Freddy Loko 1–1
 Ainur Shaibakov – Jan Groenendijk 1–1
 Raimonds Vipulis – Roel Boomstra 1–1
 Jean Marc Ndjofang – Artem Ivanov 1–1
 Ron Heusdens – Alexander Baliakin 1–1

Round 3
 Alexander Baliakin – Wouter Sipma 1–1
 Artem Ivanov – Ron Heusdens 1–1
 Roel Boomstra – Jean Marc Ndjofang 1–1
 Jan Groenendijk – Raimonds Vipulis 2–0
 Freddy Loko – Ainur Shaibakov 1–1
 NDiaga Samb – Ganjargal Ganbaatar 1–1
 Leopold Kouogueu – Arnaud Cordier 1–1
 Dul Erdenebileg – Frantz Forbin 1–1
 Alexander Georgiev – Ncho Joel Atse 1–1
 Allan Silva – Alexey Chizhov 1–1

Round 4
 Wouter Sipma – Alexey Chizhov 1–1
 Ncho Joel Atse – Allan Silva 1–1
 Frantz Forbin – Alexander Georgiev 0–2
 Arnaud Cordier – Dul Erdenebileg 2–0
 Ganjargal Ganbaatar – Leopold Kouogueu 1–1
 Ainur Shaibakov – NDiaga Samb 2–0
 Raimonds Vipulis – Freddy Loko 0–2
 Jean Marc Ndjofang – Jan Groenendijk 0–2
 Ron Heusdens – Roel Boomstra 0–2
 Alexander Baliakin – Artem Ivanov 1–1

Round 5
 Artem Ivanov – Wouter Sipma 1–1
 Roel Boomstra – Alexander Baliakin 1–1
 Jan Groenendijk – Ron Heusdens 2–0
 Freddy Loko – Jean Marc Ndjofang 1–1
 NDiaga Samb – Raimonds Vipulis 1–1
 Leopold Kouogueu – Ainur Shaibakov 1–1
 Dul Erdenebileg – Ganjargal Ganbaatar 2–0
 Alexander Georgiev – Arnaud Cordier 2–0
 Allan Silva – Frantz Forbin 2–0
 Alexey Chizhov – Ncho Joel Atse 1–1

Round 6
 Wouter Sipma – Ncho Joel Atse 1–1
 Frantz Forbin – Alexey Chizhov 1–1
 Arnaud Cordier – Allan Silva 1–1
 Ganjargal Ganbaatar – Alexander Georgiev 1–1
 Ainur Shaibakov – Dul Erdenebileg 1–1
 Raimonds Vipulis – Leopold Kouogueu 1–1
 Jean Marc Ndjofang – NDiaga Samb 1–1
 Ron Heusdens – Freddy Loko 2–0
 Alexander Baliakin – Jan Groenendijk 1–1
 Artem Ivanov – Roel Boomstra 1–1

Round 7
 Roel Boomstra – Wouter Sipma 1–1
 Jan Groenendijk – Artem Ivanov 1–1
 Freddy Loko – Alexander Baliakin 1–1
 NDiaga Samb – Ron Heusdens 1–1
 Leopold Kouogueu – Jean Marc Ndjofang 1–1
 Dul Erdenebileg – Raimonds Vipulis 1–1
 Alexander Georgiev – Ainur Shaibakov 1–1
 Allan Silva – Ganjargal Ganbaatar 1–1
 Alexey Chizhov – Arnaud Cordier 1–1
 Ncho Joel Atse – Frantz Forbin 2–0

Round 8
 Wouter Sipma – Frantz Forbin 2–0
 Arnaud Cordier – Ncho Joel Atse 1–1
 Ganjargal Ganbaatar – Alexey Chizhov 0–2
 Ainur Shaibakov – Allan Silva 1–1
 Raimonds Vipulis – Alexander Georgiev 1–1
 Jean Marc Ndjofang – Dul Erdenebileg 1–1
 Ron Heusdens – Leopold Kouogueu 1–1
 Alexander Baliakin – NDiaga Samb 1–1
 Artem Ivanov – Freddy Loko 2–0
 Roel Boomstra – Jan Groenendijk 2–0

Round 9
 Jan Groenendijk – Wouter Sipma 1–1
 Freddy Loko – Roel Boomstra 1–1
 NDiaga Samb – Artem Ivanov 0–2
 Leopold Kouogueu – Alexander Baliakin 1–1
 Dul Erdenebileg – Ron Heusdens 1–1
 Alexander Georgiev – Jean Marc Ndjofang 1–1
 Allan Silva – Raimonds Vipulis 1–1
 Alexey Chizhov – Ainur Shaibakov 2–0
 Ncho Joel Atse – Ganjargal Ganbaatar 1–1
 Frantz Forbin – Arnaud Cordier 0–2

Round 10
 Wouter Sipma – Arnaud Cordier 1–1
 Ganjargal Ganbaatar – Frantz Forbin 1–1
 Ainur Shaibakov – Ncho Joel Atse 1–1
 Raimonds Vipulis – Alexey Chizhov 1–1
 Jean Marc Ndjofang – Allan Silva 1–1
 Ron Heusdens – Alexander Georgiev 0–2
 Alexander Baliakin – Dul Erdenebileg 2–0
 Artem Ivanov – Leopold Kouogueu 1–1
 Roel Boomstra – NDiaga Samb 1–1
 Jan Groenendijk – Freddy Loko 2–0

Round 11
 Freddy Loko – Wouter Sipma 1–1
 NDiaga Samb – Jan Groenendijk 1–1
 Leopold Kouogueu – Roel Boomstra 0–2
 Dul Erdenebileg – Artem Ivanov 0–2
 Alexander Georgiev – Alexander Baliakin 1–1
 Allan Silva – Ron Heusdens 1–1
 Alexey Chizhov – Jean Marc Ndjofang 1–1
 Ncho Joel Atse – Raimonds Vipulis 2–0
 Frantz Forbin – Ainur Shaibakov 1–1
 Arnaud Cordier – Ganjargal Ganbaatar 1–1

Round 12
 Wouter Sipma – Ganjargal Ganbaatar 1–1
 Ainur Shaibakov – Arnaud Cordier 1–1
 Raimonds Vipulis – Frantz Forbin 2–0
 Jean Marc Ndjofang – Ncho Joel Atse 1–1
 Ron Heusdens – Alexey Chizhov 1–1
 Alexander Baliakin – Allan Silva 1–1
 Artem Ivanov – Alexander Georgiev 1–1
 Roel Boomstra – Dul Erdenebileg 1–1
 Jan Groenendijk – Leopold Kouogueu 2–0
 Freddy Loko – NDiaga Samb 0–2

Round 13
 NDiaga Samb – Wouter Sipma 1–1
 Leopold Kouogueu – Freddy Loko 1–1
 Dul Erdenebileg – Jan Groenendijk 1–1
 Alexander Georgiev – Roel Boomstra 1–1
 Allan Silva – Artem Ivanov 1–1
 Alexey Chizhov – Alexander Baliakin 1–1
 Ncho Joel Atse – Ron Heusdens 2–0
 Frantz Forbin – Jean Marc Ndjofang 0–2
 Arnaud Cordier – Raimonds Vipulis 1–1
 Ganjargal Ganbaatar – Ainur Shaibakov 1–1

Round 14
 Raimonds Vipulis – Ganjargal Ganbaatar 2–0
 Wouter Sipma – Ainur Shaibakov 1–1
 Jean Marc Ndjofang – Arnaud Cordier 1–1
 Ron Heusdens – Frantz Forbin 2–0
 Alexander Baliakin – Ncho Joel Atse 1–1
 Artem Ivanov – Alexey Chizhov 1–1
 Roel Boomstra – Allan Silva 1–1
 Jan Groenendijk – Alexander Georgiev 1–1
 Freddy Loko – Dul Erdenebileg 2–0
 NDiaga Samb – Leopold Kouogueu

Round 15
 Leopold Kouogueu – Wouter Sipma 1–1
 Dul Erdenebileg – NDiaga Samb 1–1
 Alexander Georgiev – Freddy Loko 1–1
 Allan Silva – Jan Groenendijk 1–1
 Alexey Chizhov – Roel Boomstra 1–1
 Ncho Joel Atse – Artem Ivanov 1–1
 Frantz Forbin – Alexander Baliakin 1–1
 Arnaud Cordier – Ron Heusdens 1–1
 Ganjargal Ganbaatar – Jean Marc Ndjofang 1–1
 Ainur Shaibakov – Raimonds Vipulis 1–1

Round 16
 Wouter Sipma – Raimonds Vipulis 1–1
 Jean Marc Ndjofang – Ainur Shaibakov 2–0
 Ron Heusdens – Ganjargal Ganbaatar 1–1
 Alexander Baliakin – Arnaud Cordier 1–1
 Artem Ivanov – Frantz Forbin 1–1
 Roel Boomstra – Ncho Joel Atse 1–1
 Jan Groenendijk – Alexey Chizhov 1–1
 Freddy Loko – Allan Silva 1–1
 NDiaga Samb – Alexander Georgiev 0–2
 Leopold Kouogueu – Dul Erdenebileg 1–1

Round 17
 Dul Erdenebileg – Wouter Sipma 1–1
 Alexander Georgiev – Leopold Kouogueu 2–0
 Allan Silva – NDiaga Samb 1–1
 lexey Chizhov – Freddy Loko 1–1
 Ncho Joel Atse – Jan Groenendijk 1–1
 Frantz Forbin – Roel Boomstra 0–2
 Arnaud Cordier – Artem Ivanov 1–1
 Ganjargal Ganbaatar – Alexander Baliakin 0–2
 Ainur Shaibakov – Ron Heusdens 1–1
 Raimonds Vipulis – Jean Marc Ndjofang 1–1

Round 18
 Wouter Sipma – Jean Marc Ndjofang 1–1
 Ron Heusdens – Raimonds Vipulis 1–1
 Alexander Baliakin – Ainur Shaibakov 1–1
 Artem Ivanov – Ganjargal Ganbaatar 1–1
 Roel Boomstra – Arnaud Cordier 2–0
 Jan Groenendijk – Frantz Forbin 2–0
 Freddy Loko – Ncho Joel Atse 1–1
 NDiaga Samb – Alexey Chizhov 1–1
 Leopold Kouogueu – Allan Silva 1–1
 Alexander Georgiev – Dul Erdenebileg 1–1

Round 19
 Alexander Georgiev – Wouter Sipma 1–1
 Allan Silva – Dul Erdenebileg 1–1
 Alexey Chizhov – Leopold Kouogueu 2–0
 Ncho Joel Atse – NDiaga Samb 0–2
 Frantz Forbin – Freddy Loko 1–1
 Arnaud Cordier – Jan Groenendijk 1–1
 Ganjargal Ganbaatar – Roel Boomstra 1–1
 Ainur Shaibakov – Artem Ivanov 0–2
 Raimonds Vipulis – Alexander Baliakin 0–2
 Jean Marc Ndjofang – Ron Heusdens 1–1

See also
List of Draughts World Championship winners

References

External links
Annex 17 Individual FMJD Competitions - The World Championship
The World Championship 2015. Rules and regulations
World Championship 2015
Worldchampionship Draughts 2015

2015 in draughts
Draughts world championships
World Draughts
International sports competitions hosted by the Netherlands
Sports competitions in Emmen, Netherlands